Nakučani may refer to:

 Nakučani (Gornji Milanovac)
 Nakučani (Šabac)